DYDR (100.7 FM), on-air as FMR 100.7, is a radio station owned and operated by the Philippine Collective Media Corporation. It serves as the flagship station of the Favorite Music Radio network. Its studios are located at the 3rd floor, Tingog Community Center, Real St. cor. Calanipawan Rd., Brgy. Sagkahan, and the transmitter is located at the Remedios Trinidad Romualdez Hospital Compound, Brgy. Calanipawan, Tacloban.

References

Radio stations in Tacloban
Radio stations established in 2011